The Representative of the United Nations High Commission for Refugees and the Representative of the World Food Programme in London are the diplomatic missions of the UNHCR and World Food Programme in the United Kingdom. They were formerly located at Strand Bridge House, a multi-use office building on the Strand near Aldwych.

Gallery

See also
 UNHCR India

References

External links
UNHCR-UK Official site
WFP Official site

United Nations
United Kingdom and the United Nations
Buildings and structures in the City of Westminster
Aldwych
United Nations High Commissioner for Refugees